The Episcopal Church of New Hampshire, a diocese of the Episcopal Church in the United States of America (ECUSA), covers the entire state of New Hampshire. It was originally part of the Diocese of Massachusetts, but became independent in 1841. The see city is Concord. The diocese has no cathedral.

Recent bishops
On June 7, 2003, the diocese elected Gene Robinson, the first openly gay bishop consecrated in the Anglican Communion.  Robinson retired in 2013 at 65. His successor is the current bishop, A. Robert Hirschfeld, who was elected bishop coadjutor on May 19, 2012, and consecrated bishop in Concord on August 4, 2012. Hirschfeld served with Robinson until Robinson's formal retirement in January 2013.

In 2016, the diocese reported 11,903 members in 49 open parishes and missions.

Bishops of New Hampshire
Source:
Alexander Viets Griswold, bishop of the Episcopal Eastern Diocese from 1811 to 1832, when the Diocese of New Hampshire was split off. The Episcopal Church lists him as I New Hampshire.
Carlton Chase (1844-1870)
William Woodruff Niles (1870-1914)
Edward Melville Parker (1914-1925)
John Thomas Dallas (1926-1948)
Charles Francis Hall (1948-1973)
Philip Alan Smith (1973-1986)
Douglas E. Theuner (1986-2003)
V. Gene Robinson (2003-2013)
A. Robert Hirschfeld (2013–present)

References

External links
Official website of the Episcopal Church of New Hampshire
A Memorial of the Right Reverend Carlton Chase, D.D., First Bishop of New-Hampshire, 1844 to 1870, with a Biographical Sketch
Journal of the Annual Convention, Diocese of New Hampshire at the Online Books Page

Diocese of New Hampshire
1841 establishments in New Hampshire
Anglican dioceses established in the 19th century
New Hampshire
Province 1 of the Episcopal Church (United States)
Religious organizations established in 1841